Euzopherodes albicans is a species of snout moth in the genus Euzopherodes. It was described by George Hampson in 1899. It is found in Australia.

References

Moths described in 1899
Phycitini